To be multifaith is to feel an affinity with aspects of more than one religion, philosophy or world-view, or to believe that none of them is superior to the others. This term should not be confused with interfaith, which concerns the communication between different religions.

This is inherent to Relativism but exists among followers of other religions such as Confucianism and the Baháʼí Faith, as well as followers of the more liberal currents within Christianity, Islam and Judaism.

See also
 Fundamentalism
 Interfaith dialogue
 Multiculturalism
 Multifaith space
 Objective truth
 Religious pluralism
 Subjectivity
 Universalism

References

Religious pluralism